Irene Schori (born 4 December 1983) is a Swiss curler from Bremgarten. She currently plays third on Team Michèle Jäggi.

Career
Schori was named to the Swiss Olympic Team in 2010. She served as the alternate for Mirjam Ott's team in Vancouver. They just missed winning a medal, finishing fourth.

Schori has participated in both the 2008 and the 2009 World Mixed Doubles Curling Championships with partner Toni Müller, and has taken gold at both of these championships. Schori and Müller were the heavy favorites to win in the 2010 World Mixed Doubles Curling Championship, but were eliminated by the China in an extra end in the quarterfinals. In an interview post-match, Schori stated that she and Müller would consider not attending next year to give a chance to other Swiss teams.

Schori played with Silvana Tirinzoni from 2009–2012 before joining the Binia Feltscher rink. She won her first World Curling Tour event with the Tirinzoni rink in 2011 at the Red Deer Curling Classic. She won the 2013 Glynhill Ladies International and the 2014 Karuizawa International with the Feltscher rink.

The 2013–14 season was a breakthrough year for Schori and teammates Binia Feltscher, Franziska Kaufmann and Christine Urech. At the start of the season, the won the 2013 Red Deer Curling Classic and made the playoffs of the Stockholm Ladies Cup and the Women's Masters Basel. They also won the right to represent Switzerland at the 2014 World Women's Curling Championship in Saint John, New Brunswick, Schori's first World Championship. They had a great round robin, finishing in second with a 9–2 record, only losing to South Korea and Russia. This sent her to the 1 vs 2 game against Canada's Rachel Homan which she would lose 8–3. They quickly rebounded in the semifinal against Korea's Kim Ji-sun setting up a rematch against Homan. After a slow first half, the Swiss team would score three points in the eighth end and steal three in the ninth, giving them a 9–5 lead going into the final end. They successfully ran the Canadians out of stones to secure Switzerland's fourth World Championship title.

The following season, Team Feltscher won the 2014 European Curling Championships by defeating Anna Sidorova in the final. They also played in three Grand Slam of Curling events, qualifying at both the 2014 Masters and the 2014 Canadian Open. They did not get to defend their title as World Champions, finishing 4–6 at the 2015 Swiss Women's Curling Championship. The 2015–16 season started slow for the Swiss rink, only qualifying in three events at the start including winning the 2015 International ZO Women's Tournament. Things changed however when they won the Swiss championship and were back at the World Championships. They finished the round robin of the 2016 World Women's Curling Championship once again with a 9–2 but this time in first place, giving them hammer and choice of stones in the 1 vs 2 game. They defeated Japan's Satsuki Fujisawa to advance to the final where they would once again play the Japanese rink. Up 7–6 in the last end, they forced Fujisawa to draw for one to tie the game but she was to heavy, giving Schori and her team their second World Women's Curling Championship gold medal and title. The team ended their season by winning the 2016 Euronics European Masters.

Team Feltscher won the right to represent Switzerland at the 2016 European Curling Championships but they did not qualify. They made the semifinal of the 2016 WFG Masters and finished second at the Swiss championship. The next season, they were able to win the Swiss playdowns, sending Schori to yet another World Women's Curling Championship. They couldn't win three in a row as the team struggled throughout the week, posting a 5–7 record. At the conclusion of the 2017–18 season, Schori left the team and formed her own team with third Lara Stocker, second Roxane Héritier and lead Isabelle Maillard.

The team's first season together wasn't very successful, only making the playoffs in three events. The team won the Gord Carroll Curling Classic the next season and finished runner-up at the Paf Masters Tour. They missed the playoffs at the 2020 Swiss Women's Curling Championship, finishing 2–4. After the season, Héritier and Maillard left the team and Schori and Stocker brought on Carole Howald and Stefanie Berset at third and lead respectively for the 2020–21 season. The team competed in two tour events during the abbreviated season, finishing third at the 2020 Schweizer Cup and reaching the quarterfinals of the 2020 Women's Masters Basel. Team Schori was one of four teams to compete in the 2021 Swiss Women's Curling Championship, where they finished in last place with a 2–7 record after the triple round robin.

To begin the 2021–22 season, Team Schori was invited to compete alongside the men's teams at the 2021 Baden Masters. There, they finished with a 1–3 record, only beating Magnus Nedregotten of Norway. Elsewhere on tour, they won the Part II Bistro Ladies Classic over Cathy Auld and made it to two other event finals. They lost to Eve Muirhead in the final of The Challenger and to Nora Wüest in the St. Galler Elite Challenge final. They also had playoff appearances at the 2021 Women's Masters Basel, Stu Sells Toronto Tankard and the DeKalb Superspiel. Team Schori competed in one Grand Slam event, the 2021 National, where they finished with a winless 0–3 record. The team finished their season with a 2–3 record at the 2022 Swiss Women's Curling Championship, not advancing to the second round. Third Carole Howald left the team following the season. Schori, Stefanie Berset and Lara Stocker then added Michèle Jäggi and Sarah Müller to their team for the 2022–23 season. Jäggi took over the team at skip with Schori playing third, Berset at second, Müller at lead and Stocker as the alternate.

In January 2023, Schori announced that she would be retiring at the end of the season.

Personal life
Schori is employed as forensics civil agent.

Teams

Grand Slam record

Former events

References

External links

Swiss female curlers
Olympic curlers of Switzerland
Curlers at the 2010 Winter Olympics
Living people
1983 births
Sportspeople from Zürich
World curling champions
World mixed doubles curling champions
People from Affoltern District
Continental Cup of Curling participants
European curling champions
People from Bremgarten, Aargau